Anyi is a county of Jiangxi Province, China, it is under the administration of the prefecture-level city of Nanchang, the provincial capital.

The county has area of 656 square kilometers, is one of the smallest county in Jiangxi. Postal code is 330500.

Administration 
Anyi County is divided to 7 towns and 3 townships.

Towns

Townships 
 Qiaole
 Changjun
 Xinmin

Climate

References

External links 
Homepage

 
County-level divisions of Jiangxi